Roy Korine (born 10 September 2002) is an Israeli footballer who currently plays as a forward for Maccabi Netanya.

Early life
Korine was born in Herzliya, Israel.

Career statistics

Club

Notes

References

2002 births
Living people
Israeli footballers
Maccabi Netanya F.C. players
Hapoel Ramat Gan F.C. players
Israeli Premier League players
Liga Leumit players
Footballers from Herzliya
Association football forwards
Israel youth international footballers